Malay is a commune in the Saône-et-Loire department in the region of Bourgogne-Franche-Comté in eastern France.

Geography
The Grosne flows northwest through the southwestern part of the commune, then forms its northwestern border. The Guye, a tributary of the Grosne, forms part of the commune's southwestern border.

See also
Communes of the Saône-et-Loire department

References

Communes of Saône-et-Loire